Karambavane is a village in Maharashtra, India. In Ratnagiri district which is near by Vashishti River.

The population was recorded as 1,563 in the 2011 Census of India.

References 

Ratnagiri district